is a Japanese feminine given name, which translates to 'Dream Child'.

People
, Japanese former film and stage actress

It may refer to fictional characters in manga, games and anime, including:
Cooking Papa
GeGeGe no Kitaro
Hime-chan's Ribbon
Kekkaishi
Maple Colors
Ninja Hattori-kun
Otomen
The Idolmaster
Wangan Midnight
Touhou Project
Kakegurui - Compulsive Gambler

References

Japanese feminine given names